Seddouk is a town in northern Algeria. The Béni Mansour-Bejaïa line traverses this community.

Communes of Béjaïa Province
Cities in Algeria